The fifth cycle of Asia's Next Top Model (subtitled as Asia's Next Top Model 5: Expect The Unexpected) aired on April 5, 2017. Filming for cycle five took place in Singapore and Malaysia. Cindy Bishop and Yu Tsai returned as judges for panel this cycle, while Kelly Tandiono departed from the show, and was replaced by Cara G. McIlroy. 

The cycle featured 14 contestants: three each from Indonesia and the Philippines, two each from Malaysia, Singapore and Thailand, and one each from Cambodia, Hong Kong, Laos, Taiwan and Vietnam. China, India, Japan, Mongolia, Myanmar, Nepal, and South Korea were unrepresented. Taiwan marked its comeback after its absences from the two previous cycles.

The prize package for this cycle included a Subaru Impreza, a cover and fashion spread in Nylon Singapore, and a modeling contract with Storm Model Management in London.

The winner of the competition was 18 year-old Maureen Wroblewitz, from Philippines.

Auditions
Casting calls were held in three countries, listed below:

October 29 at Grand Caymans, Level 10, Sunway Resort Hotel and Spa, Kuala Lumpur
November 5 at The Hermitage, A Tribute Portfolio Hotel, Jakarta

Contestants were also encouraged to apply for the competition online if they were unable to make an appearance at the live auditions.

Cast

Contestants
(Ages stated are at start of contest)

Judges
 Cindy Bishop (host)
 Cara G. McIlroy 
 Yu Tsai

Episodes

Results

 
 The contestant was eliminated
 The contestant was originally eliminated from the competition but was saved
 The contestant was disqualified from the competition
 The contestant won the competition

Scores 
(Total and average scores on the table only reflect scores calculated from the full sets added during panel)

 Indicates the contestant had the highest score that week
 Indicates the contestant was in the bottom that week
 Indicates the contestant was originally eliminated that week, but was saved
 Indicates the contestant was eliminated that week
 Indicates the contestant was disqualified that week
 Indicates the contestant was an undercover judge who is posing as a 'contestant'
 Indicates the contestant won the competition

Average  call-out order
Episode 13 & the undercover judge are not included.

Bottom two/three

 The contestant was eliminated after their first time in the bottom two. 
 The contestant was eliminated after their second time in the bottom two. 
 The contestant was eliminated after their third time in the bottom two. 
 The contestant was eliminated after their fourth time in the bottom two. 
 The contestant was eliminated and placed as the runner-up/s. 
 The contestant was disqualified.

Notes

References

External links
Official website 
Asia's Next Top Model on STAR World

Asia's Next Top Model
2017 Singaporean television seasons
Television shows filmed in Singapore
Television shows filmed in Malaysia